IF Viken is a Swedish football club located in Åmål.

Background
IF Viken currently plays in Division 4 Bohuslän/Dalsland which is the sixth tier of Swedish football. They play their home matches at the Rösvallen in Åmål.

The club is affiliated to Dalslands Fotbollförbund. IF Viken have competed in the Svenska Cupen on 25 occasions and have played 52 matches in the competition.

Season to season

In their most successful period IF Viken competed in the following divisions:

In recent seasons IF Viken have competed in the following divisions:

* League restructuring in 2006 resulted in a new division being created at Tier 3 and subsequent divisions dropping a level.

|}

Footnotes

External links
 IF Viken – Official website

Football clubs in Västra Götaland County
Association football clubs established in 1922
1922 establishments in Sweden